Siew Hong Teoh is the Lee and Seymour Graff Endowed Professor of accounting at UCLA Anderson School of Management. She is on the editorial board of the Accounting Review and the Review of Accounting Studies.

Career 
Professor Teoh obtained a BSC  and MSc in economics from the London School of Economics. She then pursued an MBA and PhD at the Graduate School of Business at the University of Chicago. Her first position was as an assistant professor at UCLA and then the business school of the University of Michigan. She was then promoted to associate professor at the Fisher College of Business at Ohio State University. She is currently the Lee and Seymour Graff Endowed Professor of accounting at UCLA Anderson School of Management.

Research 
Her research interests are mainly focused around information and capital markets. She studies how accounting information affects firm stakeholders such as managers or investors. Her research also tries to understand how the timing of information disclosure to investors affects firms, their values and stakeholders.

Her most cited article in the Journal of Finance studies how during Initial Public Offerings (IPOs), some companies and their financial issuers can report higher accruals. This makes the companies look more successful than they actually are and can impact the outcome of an IPO.

In another widely cited paper in the Journal of Finance, she looks at CEO overconfidence. The paper finds that companies with overconfident CEO (according to proximate metrics) invest more in innovation. They also obtain more patents and patent citations. On the negative side, they suffer from greater return volatility.

Her research has been cited just short of 28000 times and she is the 145th most cited female economist according to RePEC. Her research has been cited in Forbes, Bloomberg and Der Spiegel.

References 

Living people
Year of birth missing (living people)
American women educators
University of California, Los Angeles faculty
Women accountants